Daron Oshay "Mookie" Blaylock (born March 20, 1967) is an American former professional basketball player. He spent 13 years in the National Basketball Association (NBA) with the New Jersey Nets, Atlanta Hawks, and the Golden State Warriors.

College career
A  push-and-pass point guard, Blaylock was rated among the best defensive stoppers in the game. The former Garland High School, Midland College (where he earned NJCAA All American honors in 1987), and University of Oklahoma star is most highly regarded for his quick hands and a ball hawking defensive style that produced more than 200 steals in a season five times and two NBA All-Defensive first-team selections. He was also a capable outside shooter, a fine passer who generally ranked among the league's assist leaders, and a durable instigator of the fast break. In 1988, he helped to lead the Sooners to the NCAA title game.

Professional career

Blaylock was selected by the New Jersey Nets with the 12th overall pick of the 1989 NBA draft and settled quickly into Nets' rotation. He was traded with Roy Hinson to the Atlanta Hawks prior to the 1992–93 season for Rumeal Robinson, where he flourished under newly signed coach Lenny Wilkens. He spent seven years with the Hawks, leading them in career three-point field goals (made and attempted) and career steals. He was also selected for the 1994 NBA All-Star Game. He was traded to the Golden State Warriors in a deal that brought Bimbo Coles, Duane Ferrell, and the 1999 10th overall draft pick, Jason Terry, to Atlanta, and finished off his career playing as a reserve for the Warriors.

NBA achievements
 Led the NBA in steals two years in a row (1996–97 and 1997–98), joining Alvin Robertson, Magic Johnson, Allen Iverson, and Chris Paul as the only players to achieve that feat.
 Led the NBA in three-point attempts and finished second in three-pointers made in the 1996–97 season.
 Is the Atlanta Hawks' all-time franchise leader in three-point field goals made (1,050), three-point field goal attempts (3,023), and steals (1,321).
 Set the Atlanta Hawks' single-season franchise records for three-pointers made (231) and attempted (623) in 1995–96.

NBA career statistics

Regular season

|-
| style="text-align:left;"| 
| style="text-align:left;"|New Jersey
| 50 || 17 || 25.3 || .371 || .225 || .778 || 2.8 || 4.2 || 1.6 || 0.3 || 10.1
|-
| style="text-align:left;"| 
| style="text-align:left;"|New Jersey
| 72 || 70 || 35.9 || .416 || .154 || .790 || 3.5 || 6.1 || 2.3 || 0.6 || 14.1
|-
| style="text-align:left;"| 
| style="text-align:left;"|New Jersey
| 72 || 67 || 35.4 || .432 || .222 || .712 || 3.7 || 6.8 || 2.4 || 0.6 || 13.8
|-
| style="text-align:left;"| 
| style="text-align:left;"|Atlanta
| 80 || 78 || 35.3 || .429 || .375 || .728 || 3.5 || 8.4 || 2.5 || 0.3 || 13.4
|-
| style="text-align:left;"| 
| style="text-align:left;"|Atlanta
| 81 || 81 || 36.0 || .411 || .334 || .730 || 5.2 || 9.7 || 2.6 || 0.5 || 13.8
|-
| style="text-align:left;"| 
| style="text-align:left;"|Atlanta
| 80 || 80 || 38.4 || .425 || .359 || .729 || 4.9 || 7.7 || 2.5 || 0.3 || 17.2
|-
| style="text-align:left;"| 
| style="text-align:left;"|Atlanta
| 81 || 81 || 35.7 || .405 || .371 || .747 || 4.1 || 5.9 || 2.6 || 0.2 || 15.7
|-
| style="text-align:left;"| 
| style="text-align:left;"|Atlanta
| 78 || 78 || 39.2 || .432 || .366 || .753 || 5.3 || 5.9 ||style="background:#cfecec;"| 2.7* || 0.3 || 17.4
|-
| style="text-align:left;"| 
| style="text-align:left;"|Atlanta
| 70 || 69 || 38.6 || .392 || .269 || .709 || 4.9 || 6.7 ||style="background:#cfecec;"| 2.6* || 0.3 || 13.2
|-
| style="text-align:left;"| 
| style="text-align:left;"|Atlanta
| 48 || 48 || 36.7 || .379 || .307 || .758 || 4.7 || 5.8 || 2.1 || 0.2 || 13.3
|-
| style="text-align:left;"| 
| style="text-align:left;"|Golden State
| 73 || 72 || 33.7 || .391 || .336 || .705 || 3.7 || 6.7 || 2.0 || 0.3 || 11.3
|-
| style="text-align:left;"| 
| style="text-align:left;"|Golden State
| 69 || 59 || 34.1 || .396 || .324 || .697 || 3.9 || 6.7 || 2.4 || 0.3 || 11.0
|-
| style="text-align:left;"| 
|style="text-align:left;"|Golden State
| 35 || 0 || 17.1 || .342 || .357 || .500 || 1.5 || 3.3 || 0.7 || 0.1 || 3.4
|- class="sortbottom"
| style="text-align:center;" colspan="2"| Career
| 889 || 800 || 34.9 || .409 || .336 || .736 || 4.1 || 6.7 || 2.3 || 0.3 || 13.5
|- class="sortbottom"
| style="text-align:center;" colspan="2"| All-Star
| 1 || 0 || 16.0 || .400 || .500 || — || 1.0 || 2.0 || 2.0 || — || 5.0

Playoffs

|-
|style="text-align:left;"|1992
|style="text-align:left;"|New Jersey
|4||4||37.0||.309||.167||.750||4.0||7.8||3.8||0.5||9.5
|-
|style="text-align:left;"|1993
|style="text-align:left;"|Atlanta
|3||3||33.0||.360||.333||.833||4.3||4.3||1.0||1.3||9.0
|-
|style="text-align:left;"|1994
|style="text-align:left;"|Atlanta
|11||11||37.7||.340||.344||.833||5.0||8.9||2.2||0.5||13.0
|-
|style="text-align:left;"|1995
|style="text-align:left;"|Atlanta
|3||3||40.3||.367||.393||.636||4.3||5.7||1.3||0.0||18.0
|-
|style="text-align:left;"|1996
|style="text-align:left;"|Atlanta
|10||10||42.6||.421||.393||.667||4.3||6.4||2.2||0.8||17.1
|-
|style="text-align:left;"|1997
|style="text-align:left;"|Atlanta
|10||10||44.1||.396||.329||.667||7.0||6.5||2.1||0.2||16.4
|-
|style="text-align:left;"|1998
|style="text-align:left;"|Atlanta
|4||4||38.3||.415||.296||.583||5.0||8.3||2.3||0.3||14.8
|-
|style="text-align:left;"|1999
|style="text-align:left;"|Atlanta
|9||9||39.8||.326||.353||.467||4.0||4.0||2.0||0.2||12.6
|- class="sortbottom"
| style="text-align:center;" colspan="2"| Career
| 54 || 54 || 40.0 || .370 || .350 || .683 || 4.9 || 6.6 || 2.1 || 0.4 || 14.2

In popular culture
As fans of the basketball player, the band members of Pearl Jam originally named their group "Mookie Blaylock", but they were forced to change the name. They settled on naming their debut album Ten after Blaylock's jersey number.

In Tom Robbins's 1994 novel Half Asleep in Frog Pajamas, character Larry Diamond uses the name "Mookie Blaylock" as a pseudonym for hotel stays.

In the Homestar Runner cartoon "Kick-A-Ball", the Umpire tells the Announcer that Mookie Blaylock gave him the ball featured in the cartoon, a reference to a similar scene in an earlier cartoon about Mookie Wilson.

On episode 49 of the Bleav in Astros podcast, host Jeff Balke mistakenly referred to Mookie Betts as Mookie Blaylock.

Personal life
In 2011, two of Blaylock's sons, twins Daron and Zack, committed to play football for the University of Kentucky. The sons are graduates of Walton High School in Marietta, Georgia. His youngest son, Dominick, is also a graduate of Walton High School, and plays football for the University of Georgia. Mookie Betts, an outfielder for the Los Angeles Dodgers was named after Blaylock. Blaylock resides in Zebulon, Georgia.

During the afternoon of May 31, 2013, Blaylock was involved in a head-on collision in Clayton County, Georgia. He was initially placed on life support, but his condition later improved. Blaylock's vehicle traveled left-of-center, causing the accident. A family member stated he had a history of seizures, and although it was unknown if Blaylock was experiencing any symptoms at the time of the collision, he was under doctor's orders to not drive due to the seizures. Blaylock had a history of alcohol abuse, and it was determined he suffered a seizure due to alcohol withdrawal. Although initially surviving the crash, a passenger in the other vehicle, Monica Murphy, a mother of five, died as a result of injuries from the collision. Blaylock was charged with vehicular homicide, driving on a suspended license and failing to stay in his lane. Blaylock had an outstanding warrant in Spalding County, Georgia on charges of DUI and drug-related offenses at the time, but "investigators did not believe alcohol was a factor in the crash." However, Blaylock had a history of DUIs; at least seven of them.

On October 27, 2014, Blaylock pleaded guilty to killing Murphy. Facing seven to ten years at trial, Blaylock accepted a plea bargain. According to the plea, Blaylock served three years in prison and the fourth as a suspended sentence, followed by eight years of probation.

See also
 List of National Basketball Association career assists leaders
 List of National Basketball Association career steals leaders
 List of National Basketball Association players with most assists in a game
 List of National Basketball Association players with most steals in a game
 List of NCAA Division I men's basketball players with 11 or more steals in a game

References

External links
 

1967 births
Living people
20th-century African-American sportspeople
21st-century African-American people
21st-century American criminals
African-American basketball players
All-American college men's basketball players
American male criminals
American men's basketball players
American people convicted of manslaughter
American sportspeople convicted of crimes
Atlanta Hawks players
Basketball players from Texas
Garland High School alumni
Golden State Warriors players
Midland Chaps basketball players
National Basketball Association All-Stars
New Jersey Nets draft picks
New Jersey Nets players
Oklahoma Sooners men's basketball players
People from Garland, Texas
Point guards
People from Zebulon, Georgia
Prisoners and detainees of Georgia (U.S. state)
Sportspeople from the Atlanta metropolitan area
Sportspeople from the Dallas–Fort Worth metroplex